The Atlantic Coast Line R-1 was a class of 12 4-8-4 Northern type steam locomotives built by the Baldwin Locomotive Works in 1938 and operated by the Atlantic Coast Line Railroad until the early 1950s. They were immediately assigned to passenger service but eventually saw service pulling freight.

History
Upon delivery to the Atlantic Coast Line, the locomotives were immediately put in passenger service due to an increase in passenger business in the 1930s. Their P class Pacifics handled no more than 14 passenger cars without double-heading. The R-1s handled passenger trains up to 21 heavyweight cars, eliminating the need for double-heading and ran extra sections of many of the Richmond, Virginia to Jacksonville, Florida passenger trains. While they were more powerful than their Pacifics as well as being faster, running as fast as 90 mph and probably 100 mph without much trouble reaching such speeds, the ACL was very disappointed with them, as they had poor counterbalancing and were returned to Baldwin to solve the problem. When delivered, they had a bad dynamic augment. Even after the rebuild with new disk driving wheels, they still had unacceptable amounts of dynamic augment at high speeds, as their counterbalancing weights were too high, which led to the locomotive's drivers pounding at high speeds and was said that the main drivers actually left the rails and repeatedly slammed back down, kinking rails and damaging track alignment for miles. Despite their flaws, they were capable pullers. No. 1800 accelerated a 20-car, 1500-ton passenger train from a dead stop to 70 miles per hour in  minutes and 11 miles in a test. The class also ran as many as 18,000 miles a month in passenger service. R-1s Nos. 1800, 1801, 1806, 1807, 1808 and 1809 ran even more smoothly once they were fitted with lightweight pistons by Timken, piston rods, cross heads, and, probably most important, tapered main rods with roller bearing wrist pins. The class is rated at 6,200 tons on the Richmond to Jacksonville mainline. With dieselization taking effect, the locomotives were put in freight service. Retirement started in 1951 and by 1952, all have been retired.

Tenders
They were mounted on a pair of eight-wheel trucks. The weight of the tender, fully loaded was  In 1953, eight of the R-1 tenders were sold to the Norfolk and Western Railway and used on their Y-4 class of 2-8-8-2s until 1958, when they were scrapped.

Disposition
None of the R-1s have been preserved, as all were scrapped by 1952 and the remaining eight tenders lasted on the Norfolk and Western until 1958, the same year they were scrapped.

Roster

References

Bibliography

Further reading

Atlantic Coast Line Railroad
4-8-4 locomotives
Baldwin locomotives
Railway locomotives introduced in 1938
Steam locomotives of the United States
Standard gauge locomotives of the United States
Scrapped locomotives
Passenger locomotives